Douglas Sessions '05 is an album by Boston-based rock group The Lights Out. It was self-released in 2005.

Track listing
 "Pride and Shame"
 "Cant"
 "Sorry for Saying I'm Sorry"
 "Western Pariah"
 "Hostile Takeover"
 "If I Had a Hi Fi"
 "100 Hours in L.A."
 "Time for Moving On"
 "Pink and Purple"
 "Wrong as I can Be"
 "Redshift Blues"

2005 albums
The Lights Out albums